The Divine Word College of Urdaneta is a private Catholic educational institution of higher learning run by the Philippine Northern Province of the Society of the Divine Word in Urdaneta City, Pangasinan, Philippines. It was founded by the Divine Word Missionaries in 1967. Saint Joseph Freinademetz, the first SVD missionary to China, is the patron saint and model of the school.

School Presidents 
Fr. George Hardwart, SVD                                     (1967 -1970)
Fr. Augustine Herbers, SVD and Fr. Panfilo Ginan, SVD        (1970 – 1975)
Fr. Alfredo A. Reyes, SVD                                    (1975 – 1979)
Fr. Luis B. Lapus, SVD                                       (1979 – 1983)
Fr. Dennis D. Lucas, SVD                                     (1983 – 1987)
Fr. Edwin T. Canonizado, SVD                                 (1987 – 1990)
Fr. Michael O. Padua, SVD                                    (1990 – 1993)
Fr. Dominador O. Ramos, SVD                                  (1993 – 1997) 
Fr. Limneo O. Dangupon, SVD                                  (1997 – 2002)
Fr. Randolph D. Botial, SVD                                  (2002 – 2008)
Fr. Dominador O. Ramos, SVD,                                 (2008 – 2011)
Fr. Gil T. Manalo, SVD                                       (2011 – 2017)
Fr. Roberto J. Ibay, SVD                                     (2017–Present)

References

External links
 DWCU Alumni Community

Universities and colleges in Pangasinan
Educational institutions established in 1967
Catholic universities and colleges in the Philippines
Catholic secondary schools in the Philippines
Divine Word Missionaries Order
Education in Urdaneta, Pangasinan